A by-election was held in the state electoral district of Gosford on 8 April 2017. The by-election was triggered by the resignation of Kathy Smith due to ill health. It was held on the same day as the North Shore and Manly state by-elections.

Dates

Candidates

The candidates in ballot paper order were as follows:

Results

Kathy Smith resigned.

See also
Electoral results for the district of Gosford
List of New South Wales state by-elections

References

2017 elections in Australia
New South Wales state by-elections